Walter Philip Kennedy Findlay (10 February 1904 – 1985) was a US-born British mycologist.

Findlay was born to British parents in New York City. When he returned with his family to England he attended Sevenoaks School, and then Imperial College in London when he was 16, ultimately earning the Associate of the Royal College of Science in 1923. He earned an M.Sc. degree in 1932, and the D.Sc. degree in 1942, both from the University of London.

In 1927, he was appointed as mycologist of the Forest Products Research Laboratory in Princes Risborough. He was assistant director of the Brewing Industry Research Foundation in Nutfield, Surrey starting in 1958 until his retirement in 1969.

Findlay was president of the British Mycological Society in 1949, and became an honorary member in 1983. He was also several times president of the Association of Applied Biologists.

Selected publications

Journal articles

Books
Findlay, W.P.K. (1953). Dry Rot and Other Timber Troubles. 267 pp. 
Findlay, W.P.K. (1967). The Wayside and Woodland Fungi. 202 pp. 
Findlay, W.P.K. (1971). Modern Brewing Technology. 384 pp. 
Findlay, W.P.K. (1975). Timber Properties and Uses. 224 pp. 
Findlay, W.P.K. (1977). The Observer's Book of Mushrooms. 192 pp. 
Findlay, W.P.K. (1982). Fungi: Folklore, Fiction and Fact. 112 pp. 
Findlay, W.P.K. (1985). Preservation of Timber in the Tropics. 273 pp.

See also
List of mycologists

References

1904 births
1985 deaths
Alumni of the Royal College of Science
Alumni of the University of London
British mycologists
British Mycological Society
People educated at Sevenoaks School
British expatriates in the United States